The 2009 NCAA Division III men's basketball tournament was a single-elimination tournament to determine the men's collegiate basketball national champion of National Collegiate Athletic Association (NCAA) Division III.

The tournament began on March 5, 2009 and concluded with the national championship game on March 21, 2009 at the Salem Civic Center in Salem, Virginia.  The tournament was won by the Washington University in St. Louis, which defeated Stockton University (then Richard Stockton College of New Jersey), 61,52, in the title game.

The championship was the second in the Bears' history and second consecutive title.

Qualifying teams

Brackets
Results to date 

* – Denotes overtime period

John Carroll Sectional

References

NCAA Division III men's basketball tournament
Ncaa Tournament